Alejandra is the Spanish form of the Greek female given name Alexandra. It is the female version of the male name Alejandro.  Alejandra means "defender of mankind", and notable people with this name include:

 Alejandra Ávalos (born 1965), Mexican actress
 Alejandra Azcárate (born 1978), Colombian model and actress
 Alejandra Barrales (born 1967), Mexican politician
 Alejandra Benítez (born 1980), Venezuelan sabre fencer
 Alejandra Bogue (born 1965), Mexican actress
 Alejandra Bravo (born 1961), Mexican biochemist
 Alejandra Da Passano (1947–2014), Argentine actress
 Alejandra del Moral Vela (born 1983), Mexican politician
 Alejandra Echevarría (born 1989), Spanish model and singer
 Alejandra Fosalba (born 1969), Chilean actress
 Alejandra García (born 1973), Argentine pole vaulter
 Alejandra Ghersi (born 1989), Venezuelan musician
 Alejandra Granillo (born 1991), Mexican tennis player
 Alejandra Gulla (born 1977), Argentine field hockey player
 Alejandra Gutierrez (born 1979), Venezuelan actress and model
 Alejandra Guzmán (born 1968), Mexican singer and actress
 Alejandra Krauss (born 1956), Chilean politician
 Alejandra Lazcano (born 1984), Mexican actress
 Alejandra León Gastélum (born 1976), Mexican politician
 Alejandra Llamas (born 1970), Mexican writer
 Alejandra Matus, Chilean journalist and writer
 Alejandra Meyer (1937–2007), Mexican actress
 Alejandra Oliveras (born 1978), Argentine boxer
 Alejandra Peña, Venezuelan politician
 Alejandra Pizarnik (1936–1972), Argentine poet
 Alejandra Procuna (born 1969), Mexican actress
 Alejandra Ramos (born 1958), Chilean athlete
 Alejandra Ruddoff (born 1960), Chilean sculptor
 Alejandra Sandoval (born 1980), Colombian actress
 Alejandra Usquiano (born 1993), Colombian archer
 Alejandra Valencia (born 1994), Mexican archer

See also 
 Alejandra (film), a 1956 Argentine film
 Alejandra (TV series), a Venezuelan telenovela

References 

Spanish feminine given names